The following is a discography of production credited to Erick Sermon.

1988

EPMD - Strictly Business 
(All tracks co-produced with PMD.) 
 01. "Strictly Business"
 02. "I'm Housin"
 03. "Let the Funk Flow"
 04. "You Gots to Chill"
 05. "It's My Thing"
 06. "You're a Customer"
 07. "The Steve Martin"
 08. "Get off the Bandwagon"
 09. "D.J. K La Boss"
 10. "Jane"

1989

EPMD - Unfinished Business 
(All tracks co-produced with PMD.) 
 01. ”So Wat Cha Sayin'"
 02. ”Total Kaos"
 03. ”Get The Bozack"
 04. ”Jane II"
 05. ”Please Listen to My Demo'"
 06. ”It’s Time to Party"
 07. ”Who’s Booty"
 08. ”The Big Payback"
 09. ”Strictly Snappin' Necks"
 10. ”Knick Knack Patty Wack" (feat. K-Solo
 11. ”You Had Too Much to Drink" (feat. Frank B.)
 12. ”It Wasn't Me, It Was the Fame"

1990

K-Solo – Tell the World My Name
 01. "Spellbound"

EPMD - Business as Usual 
(All tracks co-produced with PMD.) 
 01. "I'm Mad"
 02. "Hardcore" (feat. Redman) 
 03. "Rampage" (feat. L.L. Cool J)
 04. "Manslaughter"
 05. "Jane 3"
 06. "For My People"
 07. "Mr. Bozack"
 08. "Gold Digger"
 09. "Give the People"
 10. "Rap Is Outta Control"
 11. "Brothers on My Jock" (feat. Redman)
 12. "Underground"
 13. "Hit Squad Heist"

1991

Saxxy – Keepyo But at Home 12" 
 B1. "Keepyo But At Home (Radio)"
 B2. "Keepyo But At Home (Club)"

Roger Troutman - (Everybody) Get Up 12" 
 A2. "(Everybody) Get Up (EPMD Diesel Remix)"

1992

K-Solo – Time’s Up
 06. "The Baby Doesn't Look Like Me"
 10. "Rock Bottom"

EPMD – Business Never Personal
(All tracks co-produced with PMD and Mr. Bozack, except track 3 co-produced with PMD and Charlie Marotta.) 
 01. "Boon Dox"
 02. "Nobody's Safe Chump"
 03. "Can't Hear Nothing But the Music"
 04. "Chill"
 05. "Head Banger" (feat. K-Solo and Redman) 
 07. "Crossover"
 08. "Cummin' at Cha" (feat. Das EFX)
 09. "Play the Next Man"
 10. "It's Going Down"
 11. "Who Killed Jane?"

Redman - Whut? Thee Album 
(All tracks co-produced by Redman.)
 02. "Time 4 Sum Aksion"  
 03. "Da Funk"  
 05. "So Ruff"
 06. "Rated 'R'" 
 07. "Watch Yo' Nuggets" (feat. Erick Sermon)
 09. "Jam 4 U" 
 10. "Blow Your Mind"  
 14. "Tonight's Da Night"  
 16. "I'm a Bad" 
 20. "A Day of Sooperman Lover"

1993

Boss - Born Gangstaz 
 03. "Comin' to Getcha" (feat. Erick Sermon)
 15. "2 to da Head"

Illegal - The Untold Truth 
 03. "Head Or Gut"
 05. "We Getz Buzy" (feat. Erick Sermon)

Run–D.M.C. - Down with the King 
 03. "Can I Get It, Yo" (co-produced by PMD)

Erick Sermon – No Pressure
 01. "Intro" 
 02. "Payback II" (feat. Joe Sinistr)
 03. "Stay Real"  
 04. "Imma Gitz Mine"  
 05. "Hostile" (feat. Keith Murray)
 06. "Do It Up"  
 07. "Safe Sex"  
 08. "Hittin' Switches" 
 09. "Intro"  
 10. "Erick Sermon"  
 11. "The Hype"  
 12. "Lil Crazy" (feat. Shadz of Lingo)
 13. "The Ill Shit" (feat. Kam and Ice Cube)
 14. "Swing It Over Here" (featuring Redman and Keith Murray)
 15. "Interview"  
 16. "All in the Mind" (feat. Soup) (co-produced by Collin Wolfe)
 17. "Female Species" (co-produced by Brent Turner)

Shaquille O'Neal - Shaq Diesel 
 03. "I'm Outstanding"  
 06. "Let Me In, Let Me In" 
 07. "Shoot Pass Slam"  
 08. "Boom!" (feat. Fu-Schnickens & Erick Sermon)

Kronic – It Bee'z Like That 12" 
 A1. "It Bee'z Like That"

Knucklehedz – Stricktly Savage 
 07. "All She Wanted"
 10. "Who Called Da Cops"
 12. "Merlin"

1994

Jodeci – Feenin' 12"
 A2. "Feenin' (E Double Gets Bizzy Mix)"
 A3. "Feenin' (E Double Gets Bizz-e-r Mix)"
 B1. "Feenin' (Get Bizzy Instrumental)"

Heavy D – Nuttin' but Love
 08. "Take Your Time"

Shadz of Lingo - A View To a Kill
 02. "Mad Flavaz" (feat. Erick Sermon)

Blackstreet - Blackstreet 
 09. "Booti Call" (co-produced by Teddy Riley and Markell Riley)

Keith Murray – The Most Beautifullest Thing in This World
 01. "Live From New York"
 02. "Sychosymatic"
 03. "Dip Dip Di" (co-produced by KP)
 04. "The Most Beautifullest Thing in This World"
 05. "Herb Is Pumpin'"
 06. "Sychoward"
 07. "Straight Loonie" (feat. Erick Sermon and Jamal) (co-produced by KP and Busta Rhymes)
 08. "Danger"
 09. "Get Lifted"
 10. "How’s That" (feat. Erick Sermon and Redman)
 11. "The Chase" 
 12. "Take It To The Streets"
 13. "Bom Bom Zee" (feat. Hurricane G)
 14. "Countdown"
 16. "The Most Beautifullest Thing in This World [Green-Eyed Remix]"

Shaquille O'Neal – Shaq Fu: Da Return
 05. "Shaq's Got It Made" (co-produced by Redman) 
 07. "My Style, My Stelo" (feat. Redman & Erick Sermon)
 09. "Nobody"

Redman  – Dare Iz a Darkside
(All tracks co-produced by Redman.)
 03. "Journey Throo da Darkside"  
 05. "A Million and 1 Buddah Spots"  
 07. "Cosmic Slop" (feat. Erick Sermon & Keith Murray)
 13. "Can't Wait"  
 14. "Winicumuhround"

Crustified Dibbs – Night of the Bloody Apes (unreleased) 
 02. "You Ain't Never Been Down"

1995

Method Man & Redman – How High 12"
 A1. "How High"

Super Cat - The Struggle Continues
02. Girlstown

Jamal – Last Chance, No Breaks
 03. ”Situation"  (co-produced by Rockwilder)
 09. ”Keep It Real"

AZ – Gimme Yours 12"
 A1. "Gimme Yours (remix)"

Erick Sermon – Double or Nothing
 01. "Intro (Skit)"
 02. "Bomdigi" (co-produced by Sugarless)
 03. "Freak Out" (co-produced by Rod 'KP' Kirkpatrick)
 04. "In the Heat" (co-produced by Sugarless)
 05. "Tell 'Em" (co-produced by Rod 'KP' Kirkpatrick)
 06. "In the Studio (Skit)"
 07. "Boy Meets World" (co-produced by Rockwilder)
 08. "Welcome" (co-produced by Rockwilder)
 09. "Live in the Backyard (Skit)"
 10. "Set It Off"
 11. "Focus" 
 12. "Move On" (co-produced by Sugarless)
 13. "Smooth Thought (Skit)"
 14. "Do Your Thing" (co-produced by Redman)
 16. "The Message (Skit)"
 17. "Open Fire"

Keith Murray - This That Shit 12" 
 A1. "This That Shit"

Questionmark Asylum – Hey Lookaway 12" 
 A2. "Lookaway (Erick Sermon Remix)"

Various artists - New Jersey Drive, Vol. 1 
 13. "East Left" - performed by Keith Murray

Powerule – Dawn To Dusk / Rock Ya Knot Quick 12" 
 B1. "Rock Ya Knot Quick"

Kapone – Get Down To It / No Jurisdiction 12" 
 A1. "Get Down to It"
 B1. "No Jurisdiction"

1996

D'Angelo – Me and Those Dreaming Eyes of Mine (The Remixes) 12" 
 A1. "Me And Those Dreamin' Eyes Of Mine (Def Squad Remix)" (feat. Redman)
 A2. "Me And Those Dreamin' Eyes Of Mine (Dreamy Remix)"

Bahamadia - I Confess (Remix) 12" 
 A1. "I Confess (Erick Sermon Remix)"

Alfonzo Hunter - Blacka Da Berry 
 01. "Weekend Thang"
 02. "Blacka Da Berry" (co-produced by Sugarless)
 03. "When You're Ready"
 04. "Keep it Tight (Interlude)"
 06. "Crazy" (co-produced by Hen-Gee)
 07. "Just the Way (Playas Play)"
 08. "Groove On" (co-produced by Jazzy Faye)
 11. "Daddy's Little Baby"
 13. "Quiet Time"
 00. "Just The Way (Remix)" ( feat. Erick Sermon)

Various artists – Insomnia: The Erick Sermon Compilation Album
 02. "Funkorama" (co-produced by Redman)
 04. "As The..."
 05. "Beez Like That (Sometimes)" (co-produced by Rockwilder)
 06. "It's That Hit"
 07. "Up Jump The Boogie" (co-produced by Sugarless)
 09. "I Feel It"
 10. "On The Regular"
 11. "Fear"
 12. "Ready For War"
 13. "Reign"

SWV - New Beginning
 04. "On & On" (feat. Erick Sermon)

George Clinton - T.A.P.O.A.F.O.M.
 01. "If Anybody Gets Funked Up (It's Gonna Be You)" (feat. Erick Sermon and MC Breed)

Keith Murray – Enigma
 01. "Intro" 
 02. "Call My Name" 
 03. "Manifique (Original Rules)"  
 04. "Whut's Happinin'"
 05. "The Rhyme"  
 07. "Rhymin' Wit Kel" (feat. Kel-Vicious) (co-produced by Sugarless)
 08. "What a Feeling" (co-produced by Sugarless) 
 09. "Hot to Def" (co-produced by Sugarless)
 10. "Yeah" (feat. Busta Rhymes, Jamal, Redman, and Erick Sermon) (co-produced by Sugarless)
 11. "Love L.O.D." (feat. 50 Grand and Kel-Vicious) (co-produced by Rod 'KP' Kirkpatrick)
 12. "To My Mans" (feat. Dave Hollister)
 13. "World Be Free"

Bounty Killer - My Xperience 
 06. "Change Like The Weather" (feat. Busta Rhymes & Junior Reid)

Redman – Muddy Waters
 02. "Iz He 4 Real" (co-produced by redman)   
 03. "Rock da Spot" (co-produced by Ty fyffe)
 04. "Welcome" (Interlude) 
 06. "Pick It Up" 
 09. "Whateva Man" (featuring Erick Sermon) 
 11. "On Fire"   
 16. "Da Bump" 
 18. "Yesh Yesh Y'all"  
 21. "Soopaman Luva 3" (co-produced by redman)
 22. "Rollin'"
 23. "Da Ill Out" (featuring Keith Murray and Jamal)

MC Breed – To Da Beat Ch'all 
 09. "To Da Beat Ch'all" (feat. erick Sermon)

Various artists – Don't Be a Menace to South Central While Drinking Your Juice in the Hood (soundtrack) 
 07. "Maintain" - performed by Erick Sermon

Various artists – The Nutty Professor (soundtrack) 
 10. "Breaker 1, Breaker 2" - performed by Def Squad

1997

Tha Truth! -  Makin' Moves... Everyday
 03. "I Wanna Know"
 06. "What U Do 2 Me" (feat. Kenny Greene)
 11. "Red Lights / Bustin' Out (On Funk)"

Warren G – I Shot the Sheriff (Remix)
 B2. "I Shot The Sheriff (EPMD Radio Remix)"

Lyndon David Hall - Do I Qualify? 12"
 B1. "Do I Qualify? (Def Squad Remix - No. 2 Remix)"
 B3. "Do I Qualify? (Def Squad Remix - No. 1 Remix)"

L.L. Cool J – Phenomenon
 07. "4, 3, 2, 1" (feat. Method Man, DMX, Canibus & Redman)

EPMD – Back in Business
 01. "Intro"
 02. "Richter Scale"
 03. "Da Joint" (co-produced by rockwilder)
 04. "Never Seen Before"
 06. "Intrigued"
 07. "Last Man Standing" (co-produced by PMD)
 08. "Get wit This"
 09. "Do It Again"
 10. "Apollo Interlude"
 11. "You Gots 2 Chill '97" (co-produced by PMD)
 13. "K.I.M. (Keep It Movin')"
 16. "Never Seen Before (Remix)"

Def Squad - Rappers Delight 12" 
 A2. "Rappers Delight"

1998

Def Squad – El Niño
 02. "Check n' Me Out"
 03. "Countdown" (feat. Jamal & PMD)
 04. "Full Cooperation"
 05. "Ride Wit Us" (feat. Too Short)
 07. "Rhymin' Wit' Biz" (feat. Biz Markie)
 08. "The Game" (Freestyle)
 10. "Can U Dig It?"
 12. "Y'all Niggas Ain't Ready"
 13. "Say Word!"
 14. "No Guest List"
 16. "Def Squad Delite"

Beverley Knight - Rewind (Find A Way) 12" 
 B2. "Rewind (Erick Sermon Mix)"

Jay-Z – Vol. 2... Hard Knock Life
 11. "Reservoir Dogs" (featuring The LOX, Beanie Sigel & Sauce Money) (co-produced by Rockwilder & Darold Trotter)

Angie Stone 
 "No More Rain (In This Cloud) (Remix)" ( feat. Loon)

Method Man – Tical 2000: Judgement Day
 18. "Step by Step"  
 24. "Big Dogs" (featuring Redman)

Redman – Doc's da Name 2000
 02. "Let da Monkey Out" 
 04. "Get It Live" 
 07. "Cloze Ya Doorz" (featuring Diezzel Don, Double-O, Gov Mattic, Roz and Young Zee)
 08. "I Don't Kare"  (co-produced by Redman)
 09. "Boodah Break" 
 11. "Keep On '99"  
 12. "Well All Rite Cha" (featuring Method Man)
 16. "Da Da DaHHH"
 18. "Down South Funk" (featuring Erick Sermon & Keith Murray)
 19. "D.O.G.S."  
 22. "Brick City Mashin'"

1999

Dave Hollister - Ghetto Hymns 
 09. "Call on Me"
 10. "Missin' You" (co-produced by Dave Hollister)
 13. "The Program"

Heavy D – Heavy
 07. "Ask Heaven" (feat. Chico DeBarge)

Ja Rule – Venni Vetti Vecci
 14. "E-Dub and Ja" (featuring Erick Sermon)

Too Short – Can't Stay Away
 11. "Invasion Of The Flat Booty Bitches"

EPMD - Out of Business
 02. "Pioneers"
 03. "Right Now"
 05. "Symphony"
 06. "Hold Me Down"
 07. "Rap Is Still Outta Control" (co-produced by PMD)
 08. "The Fan"
 09. "Draw"
 10. "U Got Shot"
 12. "The Funk"
 13. "Symphony 2000"
 14. "Jane 6"

Chico DeBarge - Soopaman Lover 
 A1. "Soopaman Lover (Street Version)"

Method Man & Redman – Blackout!
 02. "Blackout" 
 03. "Mi Casa" 
 04. "Y.O.U." 
 05. "4 Seasons" (featuring LL Cool J and Ja Rule)
 08. "Tear It Off" 
 11. "Maaad Crew"

Keith Murray – It's a Beautiful Thing
 01. "Intro"  
 02. "When I Rap" 
 03. "Incredible" (feat. LL Cool J)
 04. "Some Shit" (feat. Canibus and Déjà Vu)
 05. "Bodega Skit"  
 06. "Slap Somebody"  
 07. "Secret Indictment"   
 08. "Radio"  
 09. "Intersection"   
 10. "Shut the Fuck Up"  
 11. "Interlude" 
 12. "Media"  
 13. "Life on the Street"  
 14. "Ride Wit Us" (feat. Erick Sermon, Redman, and Too Short)
 15. "Jungle Boogie"   
 16. "High as Hell"
 17. "Bad Day"
 18. "A Message from Keith"
 19. "My Life" (feat. Déjà Vu)

Various artists - The Corruptor (soundtrack) 
 12. "Be My Dirty Love" - performed by Too Short

Funkmaster Flex - The tunnel 
 10. "Okay" (feat. Redman and Erick Sermon)

2000

50 Cent - Power of the Dollar (EP version) 
 03. "Da Heatwave" (featuring Noreaga)

Mos Def & Pharoahe Monch - Oh No 12" 
 A1. "Oh No" (feat. Nate Dogg)

Saukrates - W.K.Y.A. 12"
A1. "W.K.Y.A." (feat. Redman)

Dilated Peoples - The Platform (Erik Sermon Remix) / Weed V. Beer 
 A1. "The Platform (Remix)"

Erick Sermon - Erick Onasis
 01. "Talk To Me (Skit)"
 03. "Don't Get Gassed"
 04. "Why Not" (feat. Slick Rick)
 06. "Hostility"  (feat. Redman and Keith Murray)
 07. "Mastering With E (Skit)"
 08. "So Sweet" (feat. Eazy-E)
 09. "Focus" (feat. DJ Quik and Xzibit)
 10. "Feel Me Baby" (feat. Khari and Sy Scott)
 11. "Can't Stop" (feat. Dave Hollister and Peter Moore)
 12. "Get Da Money"  (feat. Ja Rule)
 14. "Sermon (Speech)"
 15. "Vangundy" (feat. Big Kim, Billy Billions, Boe & Ruck, Nolan Epps, PMD, and Sy Scott)
 16. "Fat Gold Chain" (feat. Too Short)

Too Short – You Nasty
 12. "Be My Dirty Love"

Scarface – The Last of a Dying Breed
 04. "It Ain't Part II"

Xzibit – Restless
 06. "Alkaholik" (featuring Erick Sermon, J-Ro & Tash)
 09. "Double Time"

Various artists – Nutty Professor II: The Klumps (soundtrack)
 05. "Even If" - performed by Method Man
 14. "Off the Wall" - performed by Eminem and Redman

2001

Redman – Malpractice
 02. "Diggy Doc"  
 03. "Lick a Shot"  
 07. "Real Niggaz" (featuring Icarus, Mally G, Scarface and Treach)
 09. "Da Bullshit" (featuring Icarus)
 13. "J.U.M.P."
 15. "Bricks Two" (featuring D-Don, Double-O, Roz, Shooga Bear and Pacewon)
 16. "Wrong 4 Dat" (featuring Keith Murray)
 21. "Soopaman Luva 5" (Part I)

Erick Sermon - Music
 01. "Rapture"
 03. "Come Thru"
 04. "Music"
 05. "Skit I"
 06. "Now Whut's Up" (feat. Redman, Keith Murray & Sy Scott)
 07. "I'm That Nigga"
 08. "Genius E Dub"
 09. "Skit II"
 10. "Ain't No Future...2001"
 11. "Do-Re-Mi" (feat.  LL Cool J & Scarface)
 12. "I'm Hot"
 13. "Up Them Thangs" (feat. Cadillac Tah & Keith Murray)
 14. "The Sermon"
 15. "Skit III"
 16. "Music [Remix]" (feat.  Redman & Keith Murray)
 17. "Headbanger 2001" (performed by EPMD)

Dave Hollister – One Woman Man 12" 
 A1. "One Woman Man" (feat. Redman)

Various artists – How High (soundtrack)
 02. "Part II" - performed by Method Man & Redman

Rahsun – What's My Name? 12" 
 A1. "What's My Name?" (feat. Erick Sermon)

Bowtie – Son of a Junkie 
 07. "Get Up"

2002

Xzibit – Man vs. Machine
 14. "Right On"

Xzibit – Multiply - The Remixes
 A1. "Multiply (Erick Sermon Remix)"

Erick Sermon - React
 01. "Intro"
 02. "Here I Iz"
 04. "Party Right"
 06. "Skit I"
 08. "Love Iz" (feat. 
 09. "Go Wit Me" (co-produced by Andre Ramseur)
 10. "Skit II"
 12. "Tell Me" (feat. MC Lyte & Rah Digga)
 13. "Skit III"
 14. "S.O.D." (feat. Icarus, Red Cafe & Sy Scott) (co-produced by Kaos)
 15. "Hip Hop Radio"
 16. "Skit IV (Khari)"
 17. "Don't Give Up"

Various artists - Lyricist Lounge 2 
 08. "W.K.Y.A." - Saukrates feat. Redman
 12. "Battle" - Erick Sermon and Sy Scott

50 Cent – Guess Who's Back? 
 18. "Doo Wop Freestyle"

Sy Scott - Now What's Up 12" 
 A1. "Now What's Up" (feat. Erick Sermon, Redman, Keith Murray)

2003

Various artists – The Desert Storm Mixtape: Blok Party, Vol. 1
 03. "What, Why, Where, When" - performed by Styles P

PMD – The Awakening
 14. "Look at U Now" (feat.Erick Sermon)

Beyoncé – Naughty Girl Remix 12"
 A1. "Naughty Girl (Remix)" (feat. Redman)

Keith Murray – He's Keith Murray 
 04. "Yeah Yeah U Know It" (co-produced by Just Blaze)
 09. "Sucka Free"
 16. "Say Goodnite" (co-produced by Pete Rock)
 17. "Child Of The Streets (Man Child)" (co-produced by Keith Murray)

Ludacris – Chicken-n-Beer 
 11. "Hip Hop Quotables"

Troy S.L.U.G.S. -  Troy S.L.U.G.S. 
 13. "Party Going On"
 14. "Paradise"

D12 – Limited Edition Mixtape 
 18. "Tonight" (co-produced by Redman)

Erick Sermon - Close the Club 12" 
 A1. "Close the Club" (feat. Redman, Sy Scott & Alfonzo Hunter)

Hit Squad – Zero Tolerance 
 03. "U Can't" - performed by PMD

2004

Tony Touch - The Piece Maker 2
 03. "How You Want It"

Erick Sermon - Chilltown, New York
 01. "Home (Intro)"
 02. "Wit Ee's"
 03. "Relentless"
 04. "Jackin' For Rhymes (Skit)"
 05. "Street Hop" (feat. Redman & Tre)
 06. "Chillin'" (feat. Talib Kweli & Whip Montez)
 07. "Like Me"
 08. "Matrix (Skit)"
 09. "God Sent"
 10. "I'm Not Him"
 11. "MC One Bar (Skit)"
 12. "Feel It" (feat. Sy Scott & Sean Paul)
 13. "Future Thug" (feat. 11/29 & Redman)
 14. "Do You Know"
 15. "Listen" (feat.  Keith Murray & Sy Scott)
 16. "Hip Hop (Skit)"
 17. "Can U Hear Me Now"

The Perceptionists – The Razor 
 02. "The Dope Intro" (co-produced by PMD)

Squabble – Push Back 12" 
 A1. "Short Radio"
 A2. "Long Radio"
 A3. "Short Street"
 B1. "Long Street"

Dray – I Live It 12" 
 A1. "I Live it"

2005

Bizarre - Hannicap Circus 
 14. "Bad Day"

Various - The Longest Yard (soundtrack) 
 06. "So Fly" - performed by Akon and Blewz

Lost Boyz - Forever
 05. "Keep Ridin'"
 14. "We Ain't Stoppin'" (feat. Erick Sermon & Netty)

Boyz n da Hood – Boyz n da Hood 
 06. "Gangstas"

2006

Amir - Lyrical Terrorist 
 04. "Lugeez I Spit" (feat. Erick Sermon)

The Black Eyed Peas - Renegotiations: The Remixes 
 02. "Ba Bump (Erick Sermon Remix)"

Busta Rhymes – The Big Bang 
 09. "Goldmine" (featuring Raekwon) (co-produced by Dr. Dre)

Method Man – 4:21... The Day After
 03. "Problem"  
 07. "Dirty Mef" (feat. Ol' Dirty Bastard) (co-produced by Mathematics)
 12. "Got to Have It"  
 13. "Say" 
 17. "Walk On" (feat. Redman) (co-produced by RZA and Versatile)

Keith Murray  – One 4 Da Money CDS 
 01. "One 4 Da Money"

2007

Redman  – Red Gone Wild: Thee Album 
 09. "Walk In Gutta" (featuring Erick Sermon, Keith Murray & Biz Markie)
 12. "Rite Now"  
 21. "Soopaman Luva 6 (Part I)" (featuring E3, Hurricane G and Melanie Rutherford)

Keith Murray  – Rap-Murr-Phobia (The Fear of Real Hip-Hop) 
 01. Walk Up (Skit) feat Tone Capone
 02. Da Fuckery
 03. Weeble Wobble 
 04. Don't Fuck Wit Em' 
 05. I Love It When It Rains (Skit)
 06. U Ain't Nobody feat. Def Squad
 07. Do
 08. Nobody Do It Better feat. Tyrese & Junior 
 09. Hustle On 
 10. Whatmakeaniggathinkdat feat. Lil Jamal
 11. What It Is feat. Method Man and 50 Grand
 12. We Ridin feat. L.O.D.
 13. Da Beef Murray Show (Skit) feat. Taya and Baggy Bones
 14. Never Did Shit feat. Unique
 15. Something Like A Model feat. Junior 
 16. Late Night feat. L.O.D., Ming Bolla, Bosie & Ryze
 17. Hey Ladies (Bonus Track)
 18. Real in the Field (Bonus Track)

Infamous Mobb - Reality Rap 
 04. "Betti Bye Bye"

Vic Damone - Why U Mad 12" 
 01. "Why U Mad" (feat. Joell Ortiz)
 02. "Fuck 'Em"

2008

EPMD - We Mean Business
 02. "What You Talkin'" (feat. Havoc)
 03. "Roc-Da-Spot"  
 04. "Blow" (co-produced by JFK)
 05. "Run It" (feat. KRS-One)
 07. "Listen Up" (feat. Teddy Riley)
 08. "Bac Stabbers" (co-produced with PMD)
 13. "Actin' Up" (feat. Vic D, Tre)

2009

Method Man & Redman – Blackout! 2
 04. "Dangerous MCees" 
 15. "Neva Herd Dis B4"

Ja Rule – The Mirror
 09. "Ladies"

Raekwon – Only Built 4 Cuban Linx... Pt. II
 10. "Baggin Crack"

The Undergods – Canibus And Keith Murray Are The Undergods 
 01. "129"
 04. "Gotta Be Real"
 05. "Stop Frontin'"
 07. "Show 'N Prove"

2011

Canibus & Keith Murray : Undergods – In Gods We Trust, Crush Microphones To Dust 
 07. "The Guilty Will Pay" (feat. Erick Sermon and Crooked I)

2012

Ghostface Killah & Sheek Louch - Wu Block 
 12. "Do It Like Us" (featuring Raekwon)

2013

Tony Touch – The Piece Maker 3: Return of the 50 MC's 
 23. "Let's Go" (feat. Erick Sermon, Method Man & Redman)

2015

Erick Sermon - E.S.P. (Erick Sermon's Perception)
 01. "The Sermon"
 02. "Daydreamer" (feat.  The Voice & Too Short)
 03. "Angry" (feat. The Voice)
 04. "Lyrics"
 05. "Make Room" (feat. Joell Ortiz & Sheek Louch)
 06. "Serious" (feat. Syleena Johnson)
 07. "One Shot" (feat. Masspike Miles)
 08. "Jokes"
 09. "Clutch" (feat. Method Man & Redman)
 10. "With You" (feat. Faith Evans)
 11. "Culture" (feat. Fish Grease & Twone Gabz)
 12. "Still Gettin' It" (feat. Krayzie Bone & Ryize)
 13. "Neva Take" (feat. Fred Da Godson & Keith Murray)
 14. "Jack Move" (feat. Jarren Benton)
 15. "Impostors"

RahSun – Whats My Name CDS 
 01. "What's My Name" (feat. Erick Sermon)

2017

Bell Biv DeVoe - Three Stripes 
 05. "Run"

2018

Termanology - Bad Decisions 
 08. "Are You Sure"

P Wise - Heart of The City (Single) 
01. "Heart of The City"

2020

Joell Ortiz & Crooked I - H.A.R.D. 
02. "Get Ya Money" (co-produced by Boogeyman)

Conway the Machine - From King to a God 
 11. "Forever Droppin Tears" (feat. El Camino) (co-produced by Rockwilder)

Other

Mr. Cheeks 
 "Get Up the Volume" (feat. Keith Murray)
 "Make Music"

Bizarre 
 "Holla at Cha"

Production discographies